Waller High School is a public high school in unincorporated Harris County, Texas, north of Waller, and classified as a 6A school by the UIL.  It is part of the Waller Independent School District and serves students from Waller, Pine Island, Prairie View, unincorporated sections of Waller County (including Fields Store), and unincorporated sections of Harris County (including Hockley).   In 2013, the school was rated "Met Standard" by the Texas Education Agency.

Academics
The 2003-2004 Waller High School Computer Science Team won the UIL 4A State Championship.

The 2004-2005 Waller High School Computer Science Team won the UIL 4A State Championship.

The 2004-2005 Waller High School Computer Science Team won the TCEA Large School (4A-5A) State Co-Championship.

The 2020-2021 Waller High School Social Studies Team won the UIL 5A State Championship.

The 2021-2022 Waller High School Current Events Team won the UIL 5A State Championship.

The Waller High School UIL Academic Team won the district sweepstakes championship in 2002, 2011, 2012, 2013, 2019, and 2021.

Athletics
The 2007-08 Waller girls' wrestling team won both the 2008 State Duals title as well as District 22-5A and Region III-5A titles.

The 2007 Bulldog football team went 4 rounds deep in the playoffs, losing to Dayton in the regional final.

The 2008-09 girls' basketball team ended a 20+ year playoff drought by advancing to the postseason.

The district also has a new 10,000 seat stadium adjacent to the high school which opened on August 28, 2009.

Notable alumni
 Joplo Bartu - linebacker for the Arizona Cardinals of the National Football League
 Bomani Jones - ESPN personality
 Jason Phillips - former linebacker for the Philadelphia Eagles of the National Football League
 DJ Premier - Record Producer and DJ

 A. J. Foyt IV - former Indy Car Driver

References

External links
 Waller High School
 Waller High School Band
 Lincon Park Resource

Public high schools in Harris County, Texas